Granitsa ( from the Slavic word for "border") is a village in the municipal unit of Molossoi, Ioannina regional unit, Greece. In 2011 its population was 85. It is situated on a hillside on the left bank of the river Tyria. It is 4 km southeast of Polydoro, 4 km west of Chinka and 24 km west of Ioannina.

Population

See also

List of settlements in the Ioannina regional unit

External links
Granitsa at the GTP Travel Pages

References

Populated places in Ioannina (regional unit)